Emiliano Massa and Kei Nishikori won the title, defeating Artur Chernov and Valery Rudnev in the final, 2–6, 6–1, 6–2.

Seeds

  Thiemo de Bakker /  Alexandre Sidorenko (second round)
  Luka Belić /  Antonio Veić (semifinals)
  Jamie Hunt /  Donald Young (second round)
  Paris Gemouchidis /  Nicolas Santos (quarterfinals)
  Roman Jebavý /  Hans Podlipnik Castillo (quarterfinals)
  Kellen Damico /  Petru-Alexandru Luncanu (second round)
  Jeevan Nedunchezhiyan /  Sanam Singh (first round)
  Jaak Põldma /  Ivan Sergeyev (second round)

Draw

Finals

Top half

Bottom half

Sources
Draw

Boys' Doubles
2006